The Kalinin K-3 was a Soviet air ambulance monoplane designed by Konstantin Kalinin. The K-3 was based, in part, on both the Kalinin K-1 and K-2 and was powered by a BMW IV engine.  It had a metal airframe and an enclosed cabin, holding four passengers or two stretchers. A large hatch allowed stretchers to be easily loaded and unloaded.  Production of the K-3 began in 1927.

Operators

Soviet Air Force

Specifications

References

1920s Soviet and Russian aircraft
Kalinin aircraft
Aircraft first flown in 1927